Metropolitanskolen ("The Metropolitan School") was a school in Copenhagen, Denmark founded in 1209 by the Bishop , and for centuries one of the most prestigious schools in the country.

History
The school was founded in 1209 next to the Church of Our Lady built at the same time by Peder Sunesen, Bishop of Roskilde, and was named "The School of Our Lady" (Vor Frue Skole) or the "Cathedral School" (Domskolen). In 1802 it was renamed The Latin Cathedral School of Copenhagen (Kjøbenhavns Latinske Cathedralskole), but this caused problems since there was already one Cathedral School in the bishopric, that in Roskilde. So in 1817 it was renamed The Metropolitan School (Metropolitanskolen). In 1728 the building burned and was reconstructed in its current form. In 1838 the school left its original building on Vor Frue Plads, to move to a larger building in Struenseegade on Nørrebro, the original building was taken over by the University of Copenhagen. In 2010, one year after its 800 anniversary, the school was united with another school to form Gefion Gymnasium.

During its years of functioning hundreds of prominent Danes graduated from the school, and it acquired iconic status as the school portrayed in Hans Scherfig's famous novel, "Stolen Spring" (Det Forsømte Forår).

Notable alumni
1984	-  Mads Mikkelsen, actor
1985	-  Lars Mikkelsen, actor
1933	- Svend Asmussen, jazz violinist
1923	- K. E. Løgstrup, theologian
1910	- Kaj Birket-Smith, philologist and anthropologist
1889	- Christian X of Denmark, King of Denmark
1865	- Holger Drachmann, poet and painter

References

Schools in Copenhagen
Listed educational buildings in Copenhagen
Gymnasiums in Copenhagen
School buildings completed in 1815
Christian Frederik Hansen buildings